The Gumball 3000 is an annual  international celebrity motor rally, which takes place on public roads. The name comes from the 1976 movie The Gumball Rally. It was established in 1999 by Maximillion Cooper, with his vision to combine cars, music, fashion and entertainment.

Since its establishment, the road rally has featured a number of notable drivers, such as Lewis Hamilton, Deadmau5, David Hasselhoff, Xzibit, Usher and Tinie Tempah. The rally changes the start and finishing point every year, with some rallies requiring travel by air to make the start and finish points. The start and finish points are normally notable cities, with London being a common stop-off due to the Gumball 3000's British founder.

The event gained headlines when two members of the public were killed, after their car was hit by an entrant who was speeding on public roads in the Republic of North Macedonia in 2007. The event has also been known to run into issues in certain countries. In the Netherlands participants had a number of cars confiscated. At other rallies, drivers have been pulled over for speeding, with a small number losing their driving licenses.

Rally format
The Gumball 3000 Rally takes on average 120 drivers, each year across countries and continents on a 3000-mile journey. Travelling on public roads in exotic cars and attending parties each night, for 7 days per year the entrants of the rally receive an exclusive rally experience. The rally was founded in 1999 by current CEO Maximillion Cooper, initially as a road trip with his friends. Organisers strongly emphasise that the 3000 is a road trip and in no way a race.

History

Foundation (1999–2004) 
The Gumball 3000 was first launched in 1999. Maximillion Cooper started the event after he and a group of friends aimed to drive their supercars across Europe on a 3,000-mile journey, they referred to as a rally. The rally was aimed at wealthy individuals, with the entry fee of $8,700 (It's risen to more than $50,000 in 2022). Participants had to use their own vehicles.

The first event took inspiration from a number of racing events throughout the world. In 1933, motorcycle racer, Erwin Baker, had crossed the United States coast-to-coast in 54 hours. He earned the nickname, Cannonball, which spawned a number of race events in both the United States and Europe over the next few decades in his honor. The Cannonball events were held in the 1970s, with the first prize being a gumball machine. It has been suggested, this is where Cooper got the name for the event from.

The first event took place in 1999, with the 3,000 mile journey starting in London, to Rimini, Italy and then back. Cooper planned different events on each night of the rally, ranging from parties to dinner events. The rally received coverage in the British media at the time as the rally and events surrounding The Gumball 3000 were attended by high-profile figures, such as Kate Moss and Guy Ritchie. The event commenced with a party at the Bluebird club in London. Cars that took place in this first rally included a British Police car borrowed from the British television show The Bill driven by Alexandra Aitken, a Lotus Esprit and a Lamborghini Diablo. Cooper made the decision not to use any form of timing or prizes for placed finishes in order to avoid criticism and promote safety.

Following the success of the first Gumball 3000 rally, the second event in 2000 began at the Marble Arch in London, before heading to Stansted airport to fly over to Spain. The rally then continued through Bilbao, Cannes, Milan, Hotel Bühlerhöhe Castle, Nürburgring GP circuit and Hamburg, before heading back to the starting city, London.

The 2000 event again attracted celebrities and high-profile names. They included Goldie and Cass Lewis in an Aston Martin V8, Tara Palmer-Tomkinson and Bruce Reynolds. The third Gumball 3000 saw the convoy travel from London through Berlin, Malbork, Vilnius, St. Petersburg, Helsinki, Stockholm, and Copenhagen before returning to London for the finale. The 106 cars that participated in the rally were filmed by MTV for a Jackass Special, the episode earned MTV their highest ratings for the year. Entrants who featured in the 2001 rally included Formula One World Champion Damon Hill in a Lamborghini and comedian Vic Reeves who drove a Mercedes-AMG.

In 2002, the Gumball 3000 made the first coast-to-coast journey across the contiguous United States, from New York City to the Playboy Mansion in Los Angeles. Checkpoints along the route included a stop at the White House in Washington, D.C., Memphis, Tennessee for lunch in Elvis Presley's mansion, Graceland, then Texas, Santa Ana Pueblo, New Mexico, the Grand Canyon and Las Vegas, with the final stop at the Playboy Mansion in Los Angeles. Among the participants were fashion designer Donna Karan, models Jodie Kidd and Amy Wesson, and actor Matthew McConaughey.

In May 2003 during the 2003 Gumball 3000, a driver in a Koenigsegg CC8S was pulled over by police after being tracked going 242 MPH in 75 MPH zone.

In 2003, Gumball 3000: The Movie was released. It was a 98-minute 2003 film feature directed by Steven Green and narrated by Burt Reynolds.

The fifth Annual Gumball 3000 rally began in San Francisco on the west coast of America and finished Miami, Florida. The rally passed through Reno, Nevada; Las Vegas; Tucson, Arizona; White Sands, New Mexico; San Antonio, Texas; and New Orleans. Featured participants included Jackass's Ryan Dunn, Travis Pastrana and professional skateboarder Tony Hawk, who drove in a Dodge Viper. 2004 saw the Gumball rally commence at the Eiffel Tower in Paris proceed through Biarritz, Madrid, Marbella, across the Mediterranean Sea to Marrakesh, Morocco, before returning to Barcelona for the Grand Prix and finishing in Cannes for the film festival. Oscar-winning actor Adrien Brody drove a Porsche 911 in the rally alongside Ruben Fleischer, who directed Gumball 3000: 6 Days in May, documenting the adventures of the 2004 rally.

Event growth and North Macedonia crash (2005–2009)

Jenson Button waved the flag in 2005, starting the London to Monte Carlo Gumball 3000 rally. Entrants drove through Brussels, Prague, Vienna, Budapest, Dubrovnik, Sicily, Rome and Florence, before crossing the finishing line in Monte Carlo. Models Caprice Bourret and Jodie Kidd along with singer Jay Kay from Jamiroquai, The Darkness and rally driver Ken Block were included in the list of celebrities that drove in the 2005 Gumball 3000 rally.

The 2006 starting flag was dropped in London where Gumballers then travelled onto Vienna, Budapest and Belgrade, before jumping on a plane in Serbia to Thailand. The route then continued through Phuket and Bangkok, before flying to Salt Lake City and finishing with a party at the Playboy Mansion in Los Angeles. Travis Barker was present on the 2006 rally, as well as Martine McCutcheon, who drove a pink Range Rover in an all-female team. Gumball 3000 Films also produced a movie following five other entrants: skateboarders Tony Hawk, Bam Margera and Mike Vallely, BMX rider Mike Escamilla and Margera's Jackass and Viva La Bam co-star Ryan Dunn.

The 2007 route was scheduled to travel from London to Istanbul, via Amsterdam, Munich, Tirana, Dubrovnik, and Athens. Over 100 contestants including actors Tamer Hassan and Danny Dyer and model and entrepreneur Caprice Bourret were scheduled to drive through 16 countries in eight days. The entrance fee for the 2007 rally was £28,000 (€41,000) for first-time drivers. In the 2007 event, two people died in North Macedonia after their car was hit by a car competing in the rally. The accident occurred on May 2, 2007, when a TechArt Porsche 997 Turbo driven by Nicholas Morley collided with a Volkswagen Golf, whose occupants were both killed. Xzibit was one of a number of drivers to lose his driving license during the rally's tour through the Netherlands.

The organisers of the Gumball 3000 initially continued the rally, until the facts about the accident became public knowledge. They then issued an official statement, cancelling the event. The subsequent court hearing found Morley guilty and convicted him of "endangering traffic, leading to death"; he was released from custody after receiving a two-year suspended sentence. After the verdict, Morley's family released a statement detailing its own expert's findings, which contradict those of the prosecution's expert.

In 2008, the rally travelled from San Francisco to China finishing at the Beijing Olympics. The rally passed through Los Angeles, San Diego and Las Vegas before flying to Nanjing in China and spending a night in North Korea for the Mass Games. From here the route then headed to Shanghai before crossing the finishing line in Beijing. 2008 was also David Hasselhoff's first rally where he drove the original car from Knight Rider. The next rally was again located outside Europe, with the rally set entirely in the United States in 2009. The route was from Santa Monica to Miami. The drivers passed through Las Vegas, over the Hoover Dam, Sedona, Santa Fe, New Orleans and Orlando. 2009 was also the year that the Coast to Coast Gumball 3000 was filmed featuring interviews with Maximillion Cooper, a gold-plated Bugatti Veyron and a video diary. Celebrities that participated in the rally and featured in the film include NBA player Dennis Rodman, MTV Dirty Sanchez's Mathew Pritchard and Caprice.

Return to Europe and recent rallies (2010–present) 
More than one hundred cars took part in the rally in 2010. The rally began in London and ended in New York, passing through Amsterdam, Copenhagen, Stockholm, Boston, Quebec City and Toronto. Michael Madsen left the rally in Belgium after a car was stopped by police for speeding. A number of celebrities took part in the event, including Idris Elba, Cypress Hill and Eve. This was the year that Maximillion Cooper met Eve, who he later married in 2014 at the end of that year's rally.

Starting in London's Covent Garden, the 2011 Gumball 3000 rally saw the entrants drive through Paris, Barcelona, Monaco, Venice, and Croatia, before finishing in Istanbul. Attendees of the launch party at the Playboy Club in London included Jo Wood, The Saturdays Vanessa White and former Pussycat Doll, Melody Thornton. Participants in the rally included David Hasselhoff, Eve, Xzibit and professional skateboarder, Tony Hawk.

The 2012 rally was a 'Sea to Shining Sea' route in the US from New York to Los Angeles, stopping in Toronto, Indianapolis, Kansas City, Santa Fe and Las Vegas.

In 2013 the rally started in Copenhagen, passed through Stockholm, Helsinki, St. Petersburg, Tallinn, Riga, Vilnius, Warsaw, Kraków, and Vienna, and finished in Monaco.

Entrants for the 15th Anniversary also included TV personality David Hasselhoff, musician and lecturer Bun B, artist Futura 2000, musician and artist Magne Furuholmen, Prince Talal M. A. Al-Faisal Al-Saud of the Saudi Arabian Royal family, musician and actress Eve, professional skateboarder Tony Hawk, bands Cypress Hill and Nero, musician Xzibit, music company EMI, fashion designer of street label UNDFTD James Bond and MTV Brazil's VJs Lucas Stegmann and André "Deco" Bujnicki Neves.

2013 also saw the announcement that Chernin Entertainment and Warner Bros had acquired the rights to produce and develop a film based around the 3000-mile rally.

In 2014, and with a cost for participants of £40,000 based on two sharing a single vehicle, the rally started in the United States in Miami, passed through Atlanta, and finished in New York City. It then proceeded, with participants and cars being loaded onto planes, over to Western Europe, starting in Edinburgh, continuing through London, Paris, and Barcelona, before finally culminating on the island of Ibiza. Sponsors included AnastasiaDate, Battery Energy Drink, Betsafe, Christie's, Nicolas Feuillatte, and YouTube.

Following the 2014 event, it was announced that deadmau5 and his co-driver Tory Belleci would be selling off the Ferrari 458 they used during that year's Gumball 3000 event. The car was listed on Craigslist for $380,000.

In 2015, one hundred cars participated in the rally, following a transatlantic route from Stockholm to Las Vegas. Stops included Norway, Denmark, Germany, the Netherlands, Reno, San Francisco and Los Angeles, with a drive through Death Valley before reaching Las Vegas. Lewis Hamilton joined the final stage of the rally from Los Angeles to Las Vegas driving a Koenigsegg Agera HH. The event received publicity in various countries for those attending the rally, which included Mötley Crüe drummer, Tommy Lee. The Top Gear crew attended the rally in a number of Dodge Vipers. The winners of the 2015 Spirit of the Gumball award were Team KQWest

The 2016 rally was from Dublin to Bucharest. David Hasselhoff waved the start flag in Dublin to mark the beginning of the rally. One hundred and twenty cars travelled from Dublin to Edinburgh, London, Rust, Prague and Budapest before ending in Bucharest. Other famous faces that took part were F1 drivers David Coulthard and Jean Alesi, Grammy-winning rapper Eve, Afrojack, as well as Major Lazer, rapper Bun B, pop star Marlon Roudette, music producer Dallas Austin, Sullivan Stapleton, reality star Calum Best and YouTuber Calfreezy. London's Regent Street had over half a million people in attendance to watch the rally.

In 2017, the rally began on July 1 from Riga, passing through Warsaw, Krakow, Budapest, Dubrovnik, Porto Montenegro, Tirana, Volos, then Athens, and finally to Mykonos for two days.

In 2018, the rally began on August 5 starting in London, passing through Domaine De Chantilly in France, Sforza Castle in Milan, Italy and heading to Bologna to fly on "Gumball Air" (A Malaysian Airlines airplane fully rented for the Gumballer by the organizers, which stopped in Kazakhstan to refuel) to head to Osaka, Japan. Some of the cars were also supposed to be flown to Japan. From Osaka they planned to go to Kyoto, Nanao, and Tokyo, where the Gumball finale party was to take place.

The entrance fee has recently run over US$50,000.

Apparel 
Since the establishment of Gumball 3000, the brand's popularity led to a standalone apparel brand being launched. The apparel is manufactured and designed in-house, with designs influenced by previous Gumball 3000 events and motorsport.

Since the launch of the apparel brand, there have been a number of collaborations with major fashion houses. These collaborations have included Puma, Adidas and Nixon.

Gumball 3000 Foundation Charity
Maximillion Cooper established the Gumball 3000 Foundation to benefit the underprivileged youth in the United Kingdom. This is achieved through education, infrastructure, and environmental projects. Since 2013, Gumball 3000 has held an auction each year throughout the rally with all proceeds going to the foundation. Prizes have included a Fiat 500 Abarth painted by American street artist, Alec Monopoly.

In 2014, the Gumball 3000 Foundation sponsored and donated $100,000 to Stand up for Skateparks, a charity founded by Tony Hawk.

In December 2015, the Foundation funded a trip for the When You Wish Upon A Star charity. The trip sent 100 terminally ill children to Lapland for just before Christmas.

Partnerships
Gumball 3000 announced a partnership with MTV in 2001 to cover the rally for five years. MTV also covered the 2007 rally.

In 2015, Guess announced a collaboration with Gumball 3000 for the 2015 rally. Guess would be designing and providing exclusive drivers jackets. The fashion brand also participated in the Stockholm to Las Vegas rally, by sponsoring 3 Dodge Vipers, driven by three Guess models. Armin Strom announced in they would also launch an official watch for the Gumball 3000.

During the same year, Revolt TV announced that they would be covering the Gumball 3000 rally. They followed the rally in a documentary style, while also interviewing Maximillion Cooper and notable racers.

Popular culture
Gumball 3000 as a brand has released a number of movies, a video game, and a card game.

In 2000, Top Trumps, a popular card game in the United Kingdom, released a version of the card game using the Gumball 3000 brand name. In 2002, Gumball 3000 the game was released on the PlayStation 2. Developed by Climax Studios and published by SCi.

Between 2003 and 2006, four films based on the Gumball 3000 rally were released. These included Gumball 3000: The Movie in 2003 followed by Gumball 3000: 6 Days in May (about the 2004 Gumball Rally) and Gumball 3000: Live 2006. The TV series Jackass also aired a Gumball 3000 special in 2005 as the fourth film during this period.

Since 2008, five more films about the Gumball 3000 rally have been released. In 2008 Mike Figgis released the experimental film Love Live Long. That same year, the documentary Gumball 3000: Off Road was released. Between 2010 and 2012, three other TV documentaries were released: Gumball 3000: Coast to Coast in 2010, Gumball 3000: LDN 2 NYC in 2011 and Gumball 3000: Number 13 in 2012.

A documentary film, 3000 Miles, was made about the 2006 rally, featuring Bam Margera and Ryan Dunn from Jackass in Bam's Lamborghini Gallardo, and skateboarders Tony Hawk and Mike Vallely and BMX rider Mike Escamilla in a Jeep Grand Cherokee SRT8. Dan Joyce from the TV series Dirty Sanchez also appears in the movie.

Routes

See also
Scumrun, an annual charity event based on the opposite spectrum of vehicles, with a maximum purchase price of £500.

References

External links

Cross-border races
Road rallying